WHPE-FM (95.5 MHz) is a radio station licensed to High Point, North Carolina, and serving the Piedmont Triad region of North Carolina, including Greensboro and Winston-Salem.  The station broadcasts a Conservative Christian talk and teaching radio format and is owned by the Charlotte-based Bible Broadcasting Network, which has Christian stations around the U.S.  National religious leaders heard on WHPE-FM include Adrian Rogers, Chuck Swindoll, Joni Eareckson Tada and J. Vernon McGee.

WHPE-FM has an effective radiated power (ERP) of 100,000 watts, the maximum for non-grandfathered FM stations.  In addition, it feeds a network of FM translator stations in North Carolina, Virginia and West Virginia.

History
1070 WHPE (now WGOS) first signed on the air in July 1947 and its FM counterpart station, WHPE-FM, came on the air in November, that same year.  That makes WHPE-FM one of the oldest FM stations in North Carolina.  Both stations were originally owned by the High Point Enterprise daily newspaper.  The newspapers initials, High Point Enterprise, formed the stations' call sign.

The newspaper sold the stations in 1953. The stations aired Christian programming in the 1960s.  For a brief time in the early 1970s, they switched to Top 40 hits.  The Bible Broadcasting Network acquired WHPE-AM-FM in October 1974, as the network's second station.  
  The price was $650,000.

On October 28, 1986, just before a fund-raiser, the WHPE studios were damaged by an arson fire.  The AM station was later sold and now broadcasts Christian programming in Spanish as WGOS.

References

External links

HPE
Bible Broadcasting Network
Radio stations established in 1947
1947 establishments in North Carolina
HPE-FM